Philip Reed also Philip Reid (c. 1820 – February 6, 1892) was an African American master craftsman who worked at the foundries of self-taught sculptor Clark Mills, where historical monuments such as the 1853 equestrian statue of Andrew Jackson in Lafayette Square, near the White House in Washington, D.C., the 1860 equestrian statue of George Washington  in Washington Circle, and the 1863 Statue of Freedom  in Washington D.C., were created.  He was born in c. 1820 into slavery in South Carolina's historic city of Charleston and was emancipated on April 16, 1862, under the District of Columbia Compensated Emancipation Act After his emancipation, he assisted Mills in installing the Statue of Freedom atop the United States Capitol, which was completed on December 2, 1863. Reid began working as an enslaved apprentice to Mills in 1842, as a young man in his twenties, who was already recognized for his talents in the foundry industry. In the 1860s, after having worked at the foundry for almost two decades, Reid's skills in working with bronze casting were recognized. In 1928, Tennessee Representative, Finis J. Garrett presented a paper honoring Reid for his "faithful service and genius", and describing the key role he had played in casting the statue of Freedom, that is now part of the Congressional Record. A memorial plaque honoring Philip Reed was unveiled on April 16, 2014—the 152nd anniversary of Emancipation in Washington, D.C.—in the National Harmony Memorial Park in Hyattsville, Maryland. It reads, "Philip Reed The slave who built the Statue of Freedom atop the U.S. Capitol died a free man on February 6, 1892 and is buried here..." In 2013, he was described by the Architect of the Capitol as the "single best known enslaved person associated with the Capitol’s construction history".

Background
Reid—who was an enslaved African American from South Carolina—was born in c. 1820, and became enslaved to Mills when Reid was about 22-years-old, according to the 1864 petition made by Mills for compensation, after slavery had been abolished.  Reid remained enslaved to Mills for over twenty years, and was finally emancipated in 1863.

Equestrian statue of Andrew Jackson in Washington, D.C. (1853) 

In 1848, the Jackson Monument Committee commissioned Mills, a self-taught sculptor to create the equestrian statue of Andrew Jackson which is now in Lafayette Square, near the White House in Washington, D.C. 

Mills moved to Washington after winning the competition and brought Reid and his other workmen with him. They erected a temporary foundry south of the White House.  According to James M. Goode, Mills with the assistance of his apprentice, Reid and laborers, produced six castings of the equestrian statue. In 1852 the casting was complete. The Architect of the Capitol  said that they had produced "first bronze statue ever cast in America" through "trial and error". This "accomplishment was extraordinary due to the absence of any formal training of any of the participants." It has been described as the first equestrian statue made in America, and possibly the first equestrian statue of a horse rearing on two legs in which no additional support was added.

Equestrian statue of George Washington in the Washington Circle (1860)

The $60, 000 equestrian statue was executed by Mills in his studio and foundry. The statue was dedicated in 1860, by then President James Buchanan.

The Statue of Freedom (1863)
Commissioned in 1855, the initial full-size plaster model of Freedom was completed by American sculptor Thomas Crawford in his studio in Rome, Italy. He died suddenly in 1857. A plaster model was cast and divided into five main sections for transport in separate crates. Crawford's widow shipped the model to Washington where it was to be cast into bronze. The crates arrived in late March 1859. An Italian craftsman assembled the five sections and it was put on display in the Old Hall of the House, now National Statuary Hall.

Largely because of the impact of the equestrian statues, in May 1860, Jefferson Davis, then-Secretary of War under President Franklin Pierce—who was responsible for public works including the expansion of the U.S. Capitol—awarded the contract to cast Crawford's Freedom  statue to Mills. 

The fragile full-scale plaster model, needed to be separated again into its five main sections to move it from the old House Chamber to Mills' foundry for casting. According to Mills' son Fisk, the Italian artisan refused to dismantle it until he got a major raise and a long-term contract. He had covered the seams of the sections with a layer of plaster that made them impossible to detect. He thought he was the only one capable of separating the delicate sections without harming them. Reid was able to find the seams by the ingenious use of an iron ring attached to the head of the figure and a block and tackle. He gently lifted the huge plaster model enough to crack the seals at the seams so he could reach the bolts inside. The statue was successfully separated into its five sections and carefully transported to Mills' Foundry.

Mills and his workmen began casting the statue in June 1860 at Mills Foundry—a large octagon-shaped studio and foundry on Bladensburg Road, Maryland.  The government rented the foundry for $400 a month and supplied the materials, fuel and labor to cast the statue. Because of this arrangement, the names of the craftsmen and laborers were recorded each day in Mills' monthly report. Philip Reid was listed as a "laborer". There is no evidence that any of other men listed as laborers were black or enslaved. Mills received the government payment for Reid's work, which amounted to $1.25 a day, with the exception of Sundays, when Reid was paid directly. The other workmen were paid $1 a day. Only Philip Reid was paid directly by the government for working on 33 Sundays.

The work on Freedom continued against the backdrop of the American Civil War (1861–1865). On December 2, 1863, the "final piece of the iconic Statue of Freedom" was installed "atop the new Capitol Dome" amid great celebration and a 35-gun salute.

After emancipation 

On April 16, 1862, President Abraham Lincoln signed the District of Columbia Compensated Emancipation Act District slave owners, like Mills, were allowed to petition for compensation. Mills petitioned for compensation for eleven slaves, including Philip Reid. His description of Reid that he submitted with the Petition said that Reid was "aged 42 years, mullatto [sic] color, short in statue, in good health, not prepossessing in appearance but smart in mind, a good workman in a foundry…" Mills had claimed $1,500 for Reid, explaining that he had paid $1,200 for Reid in 1842 in Charleston, South Carolina. Mills said, that although Reid was a youth at that time,  he had already demonstrated "evident talent for the business in which [Mills] was engaged"—his steel foundry. Mills asked $1500 for Reid, but received only $350.40. 

The 38th Congress (1863–1865) convened five days after Freedom had been installed, to "face and settle the most important questions of the century", and "passed the Thirteenth Amendment to the United States Constitution, which—when adopted by the states—abolished slavery and involuntary servitude. 

Following his emancipation, he changed the spelling of his name to "Reed"—which is reflected in Census and city records—instead of "Reid", which was the spelling used by Mills since 1842. 

According to Smolenyak's 2009 article in The Federal City,  by 1865, Reid had his own business and was "highly esteemed by all who [knew] him." The article also cited the 1870 Census, which said that Reid and his wife Jane—whom he had married in June 1862— had a two-year-old son. According to Smolenyak, in 1880, Reed's wife, who worked as a laundress, was listed as Mary P.

Reviews of Philip Reid's contributions

In 1863, with the Statue of Freedom newly installed on the Capital, a newspaper correspondent wrote,  "The black master-builder lifted the ponderous uncouth masses and bolted them together, joint by joint, piece by piece, till they blended into the majestic 'Freedom'.... Was there a prophecy in that moment when the slave became the artist and with rare poetic justice, reconstructed the beautiful symbol of freedom for America?" The Senate Historical Office reprinted these words in their tribute to Reid—"Philip Reid and the Statue of Freedom"—which is part of their series, The Civil War: The Senate's Story.

During the 70th United States Congress in 1928, Tennessee Representative, Finis J. Garrett, submitted a paper by William A. Cox, describing Reid as an "intelligent negro", a "mulatto", whose "faithful service and genius" led to the "successful taking apart and handling" of the Freedom statue. 

The 1928 Congressional Record Cox's description of Reid's role in constructing Freedom.  Fox, who was a long-time admirer of the Statue of Freedom, said that it had arrived in pieces and was cast at the Clark Mill's Foundry near Bladensburg, Maryland, under the care, ironically, of a mulatto slave. 

The Architect of the Capitol described Reid as the "single best known enslaved person associated with the Capitol’s construction history".

National Harmony Memorial Park burial 

The plaque honoring Philip Reed was unveiled the National Harmony Memorial Park in Hyattsville, Maryland, on April 16, 2014—the 152nd anniversary of Emancipation in Washington, D.C.. The plaque used the spelling "Reed", which he preferred and had chosen himself, after his emancipation in 1863, instead of "Reid" which was chosen by Mills in 1842 when he enslaved him.  

Reed died on February 6, 1892, and was buried in the Graceland Cemetery in a "marked plot in clear view of the Statue of Freedom"—"his most notable achievement". His remains had been disinterred and reburied in Columbian Harmony Cemetery in 1895. According Smolenyak's documents, the D.C. government disenterred the remains of 37,000 people from the old Harmony Cemetery and transferred them to the new Harmony National Memorial Park in Maryland in 1959. The Park's offside historian could only show the general area where Reid was buried "an empty acre of grass". The Park had attempted to reach Reid's descendants about the change and when no one responded they buried the remains without a headstone.

Notes

References

Sources
 
 "List of Petitions." House of Representatives Executive Document No. 42. 38th Congress 1st Session,February 16, 1864. 
 
Dr. Eugene Walton, "Philip Reid: Slave Caster of Freedom", The Examiner, Washington, March 1, 2005
Dr. Eugene Walton, "Philip Reid And The Slaves Who Built The Capitol" Video (25 min.), 2001
Dr. Eugene Walton, "Philip Reid and the Statue of Freedom", Social Education, September 1, 2005,    Published by Thomson Gale
Patrick Reynolds, "A Cartoon History of the District of Columbia", Red Rose Studio, October, 1995
National Council for the Social Studies, "Would the Statue of Freedom be Standing Without the Help of a Slave?"  - Education News, September 12, 2005

 Final chapter

Further reading

External links
Philip Reid and the Statue of Freedom
Philip Reid: Slave Caster of Freedom
http://www.randallrobinson.com/debtexc.html
 1994-2005.
The biography of Philip Reid

19th-century American slaves
Foundrymen
1820s births
1892 deaths
Burials at Columbian Harmony Cemetery
Burials at National Harmony Memorial Park